Village-Neuf (literally New Village) is a commune in the Haut-Rhin department in Alsace in north-eastern France.

Climate
Village-Neuf features a continentalized oceanic climate (Cfb) under the Köppen climate classification due to its far inland position within France. Winters are moderately cold and quite dry with sporadic snowfall and summers are hot, humid and stormy.

See also
 Communes of the Haut-Rhin department

References

External links

Official site

Communes of Haut-Rhin